Autódromo Internacional Ayrton Senna is a motorsport race track located in Goiânia, Brazil. From 1987 to 1989, it hosted the Brazilian motorcycle Grand Prix in MotoGP.

Layout configurations

Events

 Current

 March: Copa Truck, NASCAR Brasil Sprint Race, Campeonato Brasileiro de Turismo Nacional
 April: Stock Car Pro Series, Copa Shell HB20
 August: Stock Car Pro Series, Stock Series, Campeonato Brasileiro de Turismo Nacional
 September: Campeonato Paulista de Marcas e Pilotos
 October: Campeonato Paulista de Marcas e Pilotos
 November: Copa Truck, NASCAR Brasil Sprint Race

 Former

 Brazilian Formula Three Championship (2014, 2016–2017)
 F4 Brazilian Championship (2022)
 Formula 3 Sudamericana (1988–1993, 1995–1997)
 Fórmula Truck (1996–2005, 2007–2009, 2011–2016)
 Grand Prix motorcycle racing Brazilian motorcycle Grand Prix (1987–1989)
 GT3 Brasil Championship (2007)
 Stock Car Corrida do Milhão (2014–2015, 2018)
 TCR South America Touring Car Championship (2022)

Lap records

The official fastest lap records at the Autódromo Internacional Ayrton Senna (Goiânia) are listed as:

References

External links

Track information

Ayrton Senna
Grand Prix motorcycle circuits
FIA Grade 4 circuit
Sports venues in Goiás
Things named after Ayrton Senna